Coleophora vicinella is a moth of the family Coleophoridae. It is found from France to Ukraine and then further south.

The larvae feed on Astragalus, Coronilla, Dorycnium, Galega and Medicago sativa. They create an ochreous pistol case with many sharp ridges and a sharp ventral keel. The pallium (cloak) covers about three quarters of the case and has a pair of wing like extensions at the rear. It is strongly inflated and has a scalloped surface structure. The colour is yellowish white at first, but brown or even black later. The mouth angle is 45°. Older larvae no longer feed within fleck mines, but feed on all leaf tissue except the stronger veins. Larvae can be found from autumn to May of the following year.

References

vicinella
Moths of Europe
Moths described in 1849